Aaron Norman Thomas (born November 7, 1937), is a former American football tight end in the National Football League (NFL) for the San Francisco 49ers and New York Giants from 1961 to 1970.

Thomas was born in Dierks, Arkansas, but moved in 1948 to Weed, California, where he played high school football.  He graduated from Weed High School in 1957, and was inducted into the school's inaugural Athletic Hall of Fame in 2008.

Thomas played college football at Oregon State University and was drafted in the fourth round (47th overall) of the 1961 NFL Draft by the 49ers.  He was also selected in the 16th round of the 1961 AFL Draft by the Dallas Texans.  Thomas also played for the New York Giants (1962–1970) and was selected to the Pro Bowl following the 1964 season.

His son, Robb Thomas, also played wide receiver in the NFL.

References

1937 births
American football wide receivers
Eastern Conference Pro Bowl players
Living people
New York Giants players
Oregon State Beavers football players
People from Dierks, Arkansas
Sportspeople from Corvallis, Oregon
San Francisco 49ers players
People from Weed, California